The Sant Surdas (Sihi) metro station (formerly known as NCB Colony (Good Year) metro station) is located on the Violet Line of the Delhi Metro in Faridabad, Haryana.

History
As part of Phase III of the extension of Delhi Metro, Sant Surdas (Sihi) is the extension of Violet Line. It was opened on 19 November 2018 for public use.

Station layout

Entry/Exit

See also

Delhi
Faridabad
Haryana
National Highway 44 (India)
List of Delhi Metro stations
Transport in Delhi
Delhi Metro Rail Corporation
Delhi Suburban Railway
Delhi Monorail
Delhi Transport Corporation
Faridabad district
New Delhi
National Capital Region (India)
National Capital Region Transport Corporation
List of rapid transit systems
List of metro systems

References

External links

 Delhi Metro Rail Corporation Ltd. (Official site) 
 Delhi Metro Annual Reports
 
 UrbanRail.Net – Descriptions of all metro systems in the world, each with a schematic map showing all stations.

Delhi Metro stations
Railway stations opened in 2018
Railway stations in Faridabad district
2018 establishments in Haryana